Joseph Johnson (born March 31, 1975), known by his stage name N.O. Joe, is an American musician, hip hop record producer and songwriter. N.O. Joe was a pioneer of the Southern Hip Hop sound during the 1990s. He operates a production company named Gumbo Funk, which is also a name given to his melange of musical styles

History
Johnson was born and raised in New Orleans, Louisiana. While in high school in New Orleans, he began providing beats to local performers in Jackson Square. He was later encouraged to move to New York, where he began an affiliation with Universal Music Group as a producer.

Then known as Joe Kool, Johnson collaborated with Devante Swing, and the production group Da Bassment with that he contributed to Jodeci's first album, Forever My Lady. Johnson went on to work with Brian McKnight, R&B artist Joe and D'Angelo before moving into the rap genre.

Southern hip-hop contributions
N.O. Joe contributed to the following albums (All album contributions not listed):
Scarface, The Diary
Scarface, The Last of a Dying Breed
Scarface, The Untouchable
Geto Boys, The Resurrection
UGK, Ridin' Dirty
UGK, Underground Kingz and individual songs from various UGK albums: "Hi Life", "Murder", "Diamonds and Wood"
Odd Squad, Fadanuf Fa Erybody!!

Artist roster
N.O. Joe has also contributed as producer to various labels such as Universal Music Group (1990–2003), and Rap-A-Lot as an independent production entity. N.O. Joe has worked on several platinum songs and albums, including a number 1 single "Pushin Weight", to Ice Cube's album War & Peace Vol. 1, LL Cool J's Grammy-nominated The DEFinition and has worked with:

AZ
In 1995, AZ's album Do or Die peaked on the Billboard as the No. 1 R&B/Hip-Hop Album with chart topping hits such as the title track, produced by N.O. Joe, "Doe or Die" which reached the top twenties on the Billboard chart.
Bahamadia
"I Confess" and "Biggest Part of Me"
Brian Mcknight
In 1992, N.O. Joe teamed up with Brian McKnight to produce "Goodbye My Love" which was his first album release. The entire album went platinum and the single produced by N.O. Joe peaked on the Billboard chart in the Top 50.
Big Mike
D'Angelo
In 1995, N.O. Joe worked with D'Angelo on the UK-released version of "Cruisin".
De La Soul
Devin the Dude
Ice Cube
Ganksta N-I-P
Geto Boys
Jay-Z
Joe
Lil Wayne
LL Cool J
The Luniz
Master P
Rick Ross
Scarface
T.I.
UGK
Travis Scott
2 Chainz
Spuf don

Albums featuring N.O. Joe

Soundtracks
N.O. Joe's music has also been featured on the following soundtracks:
Jason's Lyric,
Friday
Office Space
Tales from the Hood
Johnson Family Vacation
Original Gangstas

References

External links
 
 
 List of production credits

African-American drummers
African-American guitarists
African-American record producers
African-American songwriters
American hip hop record producers
American keyboardists
Living people
Musicians from New Orleans
Southern hip hop musicians
Songwriters from Louisiana
Guitarists from Louisiana
20th-century American drummers
American male drummers
American male bass guitarists
21st-century American drummers
21st-century American bass guitarists
20th-century American male musicians
21st-century American male musicians
1975 births
20th-century African-American musicians
21st-century African-American musicians
American male songwriters